Ekspress-K is a private Russian language newspaper published in Kazakhstan. The first issue appeared on 12 January 1992.

See also
Media of Kazakhstan

References

External links

Kazakhstan Media
BBC Profile Kazakhstan Media

Publications established in 1992
Russian-language newspapers published in Kazakhstan
1992 establishments in Kazakhstan